This is a list of the breeds of domestic duck which have official recognition at national or international level.

Most breeds of duck derive from the wild mallard, Anas platyrhyncos, while a small minority are descendants of the Muscovy duck, Cairina moschata. Duck breeds are normally officially recognized and described by a national body such as a ministry of agriculture. In some countries they may be recognized by groups of enthusiasts or breeders' associations, which may also draw up a breed standard. Among these are:

 the American Poultry Association in the United States
 the Poultry Club of Great Britain
 the Australian Poultry Standards

A 

Abacot Ranger (also known as Streicher)
 African Duck
Alabio Duck
Allier Duck
American Pekin (EE; = Pekin Duck, APA)
Ancona duck
Antigua and Barbuda Duck
Appleyard (APA; = Silver Appleyard, PCGB)
Australian Call
Australian Spotted
Aylesbury Duck

B 

Bac Kinh Duck
Bali duck
Barbary duck
Bashkir Duck
Bau Duck (or Ta Duck)
Black East Indian Duck
Blekinge duck
Blue Swedish (PCGB; = Swedish Blue, APA)
Bourbourg Duck
Buff Duck (APA; =Buff Orpington Duck; = Orpington Duck, PCGB)

C 

Call Duck
Campbell Duck
Cayuga Duck
Challans Duck
Chara Chamble Duck
Crested Duck

D 
Danish Duck
Dendermond Duck
 Deshi Black
 Deshi White
Duclair duck
Dutch Hookbill

E 
East Indies Duck
Elizabeth Duck
Estaires Duck

F 
Faroese Duck
Forest Duck

G 
German Pekin
Germanata Veneta
Gimbsheimer Duck
Golden Cascade
Gressingham Duck (Wild Mallard crossed with Pekin)
 Grimao Ermaôs

H 
Haut-Volant Duck
Havanna Duck (Havann)
Herve Duck
Hook Bill (PCGB; = Dutch Hookbill)
Hungarian Duck
Huttegem Duck

I 

Idegem Duck
Indian Runner Duck

J 

 Japanice Criollo
 Jending

K 
Kaiya Duck
Khaki Campbell

L 
 Laplaigne

M 

Magpie Duck
Mallard
Mandarin Duck
 Merchtem Duck
Mulard (Muscovy/Mallard cross)
Muscovy Duck

O 
Orpington Duck (PCGB; = Buff Orpington)
Overberg Duck

P 

 Pekin (UK) – see German Pekin
Pomeranian duck
 Pond Duck

R 

Rouen Duck
 Runner (APA; = Indian Runner Duck, PCGB) Rubber Duck

S 

Saxony Duck
Semois Duck
Shetland duck
Silver Appleyard Duck
Silver Appleyard Miniature
Silver Bantam (= Silver Appleyard Bantam)
Swedish Blue (PCGB and APS: Blue Swedish; APA: Swedish duck
Swedish Yellow Duck

T 

 Tea Ankam
 Tea Kapa
Termonde Duck
Tsaiya Duck

U 
Ukrainian Clay Duck
Ukrainian Grey Duck
Ukrainian White Ducks

V 
 Venetian Duck
Vouillé Duck

W 

Watervale Duck
Welsh Harlequin Duck
 West Indian Duck
White-breasted black duck

References 

Lists of birds
Lists of breeds